Eldorado is a Belgian seriocomic road movie in the Belgian surrealist and absurdist tradition, directed by Bouli Lanners and selected for the Directors’ Fortnight (40th anniversary) 61st Cannes Film Festival 2008. The film received the André Cavens Award for Best Film by the Belgian Film Critics Association (UCC). It was the official entry from Belgium for the 81st Academy Awards, but was not chosen as one of the films to be nominated during the ceremony.

It was filmed in Wallonia.

It had the working title California Carwash and was based on an incident from Lanners's past.

Plot
Yvan (Bouli Lanners), a used car salesman, comes home late one evening to his house in the Belgian countryside. He discovers that a burglar (Fabrice) has just broken into his house and is hiding under his bed.  When the burglar tries to escape, Yvan knocks him over by throwing a metal pipe at him. Upon confronting him, he discovers that the burglar is a young man in need of money to fuel his drug addiction. Yvan decides to help this young man, who says his names is Elie, by not turning him over to the police and by giving him a little money for the road. Finally, out of pity and remembering his own brother who had died of an overdose, Yvan decides to drive Elie, at his request, to the home of his parents in southern Belgium. Thus begins a journey across Wallonia, on which they face unsettling encounters with random people and humorous situations.

Cast
 Bouli Lanners : Yvan
 Fabrice Adde : Elie/Didier
 Philippe Nahon : The collector
 Françoise Chichéry : Elie's mother
 Didier Toupy : The naturist Alain Delon
 Stefan Liberski : A mechanic
 Baptiste Isaïa : Another mechanic
 Jean-Jacques Rausin : A biker
 Renaud Rutten : Another biker
 Jean-Luc Meekers : The car distributor

Accolades

Won
Belgian Film Critics Association (UCC)
Best Film

Nominated
César Awards
Best Foreign Film (lost to Waltz with Bashir)
Best Foreign film in India "Film Fare Awards"

References

External links 
 
 

Belgian comedy films
2008 films
2000s French-language films
French road movies
2000s road movies
French-language Belgian films
Films directed by Bouli Lanners
Belgian road movies
2000s French films